Xenotrophon is a genus of sea snails, marine gastropod mollusks in the family Muricidae, the murex snails or rock snails.

Species
Species within the genus Xenotrophon include:

 Xenotrophon euschema (Iredale, 1929)

References

 
Monotypic gastropod genera